The stripe-necked tody-tyrant (Hemitriccus striaticollis) is a species of bird in the family Tyrannidae.
It is found in Bolivia, Brazil, Colombia and Peru.
Its natural habitats are subtropical or tropical moist lowland forests and subtropical or tropical dry shrubland.

References

stripe-necked tody-tyrant
Birds of Colombia
Birds of Bolivia
Birds of Brazil
stripe-necked tody-tyrant
Taxonomy articles created by Polbot